Lore Trittner (born 8 July 1933) is an Austrian former swimmer. She competed in the women's 100 metre backstroke at the 1960 Summer Olympics.

References

External links
 

1933 births
Living people
Olympic swimmers of Austria
Swimmers at the 1960 Summer Olympics
Swimmers from Vienna
Austrian female backstroke swimmers